Woodville Oval (currently Maughan Thiem Hyundai Oval and formerly Unleash Solar Oval) is primarily an Australian rules football and cricket oval found on Oval Avenue in the western Adelaide suburb of Woodville South in South Australia. It is the home ground of South Australian National Football League (SANFL) club the Woodville-West Torrens Eagles, and the former home (1941–90) of the Woodville Football Club, with the former's clubrooms and administrations offices now housing The Eagles. The oval is also the home of the Woodville Cricket Club who play in the South Australian Grade Cricket League.

The Oval
Woodville Oval has a capacity of around 15,000 people, with seating for up to 2,000 in two covered stands located on the western side of the ground, with the players changerooms located under the Barry Jarman Stand on the centre wing. Most of the spectator areas around the ground are grass banks, with the exception of the outer (eastern) wing which is six rows of concrete terracing. The playing surface of the oval is 175m x 110m making it the second longest currently in use in the SANFL behind Elizabeth Oval (178m), though if measured from fence to fence, Woodville Oval is 203m long, some 15 metres longer than Elizabeth. The main scoreboard at the oval is located in the north-eastern corner of the ground adjacent to the Woodville-West Torrens clubrooms which are located behind the northern goals.

The ground record attendance was set on 9 August 1986 when 11,026 saw Woodville, led by Captain-coach and club legend Malcolm Blight, and on their way to a rare SANFL finals appearance, defeat their hated western suburbs 'big brother' Port Adelaide 14.11 (95) to 13.11 (89) in their Round 18 match.

Adjoining the Oval directly to the north is the Woodville Lawn Bowling Club, the Woodville Croquet Club and the Woodville Glengarry Tennis Club, with both lawn and hardcourts it is one of the largest multi surface tennis clubs in the Adelaide.

On-site car parking is available for Eagles members, located near the Eagles club rooms in the north-west of the facility while limited on-street parking is available for the general public during Eagles SANFL games at the ground.

Woodville Oval is located approximately 600 metres from one of Adelaide's major public hospitals, the Queen Elizabeth Hospital.

References

External links

Sports venues in Adelaide
Australian rules football grounds